Patryk Szałaśny (born April 17, 1984 in Oświęcim) is a  Polish pair skater. His skating partner is Joanna Dusik. The couple trained in Oświęcim with Iwona Mydlarz-Chruścińska. They are the two time Polish junior national champions. Patryk also competed for a while with Claire Tabolt.

Competitive highlights
Polish Nationals : 2004 - 1st (J) --- 2003 - 1st (J)
Junior Worlds : 2003 - 17th
JGP Budapest : 2004 - 8th
Harghita Cup : 2004 - 7th (J)
Warsaw Cup : 2003 - 1st (J)
Gdansk Cup : 2003 - 10th (J)

External links
 

1984 births
Living people
Polish male pair skaters
People from Oświęcim
Sportspeople from Lesser Poland Voivodeship